The National Coordination Committee for Democratic Change (NCC), or National Coordination Body for Democratic Change (NCB), is a Syrian bloc chaired by Hassan Abdel Azim consisting of 13 left-wing political parties and "independent political and youth activists". It has been defined by Reuters as the internal opposition's main umbrella group. The NCC initially had several Kurdish political parties as members, but all except for the Democratic Union Party left in October 2011 to join the Kurdish National Council. Some opposition activists have accused the NCC of being a "front organization" for Bashar al-Assad's government and some of its members of being ex-government insiders.

Relations with other Syrian political opposition groups are generally poor. The Syrian Revolution General Commission, the Local Coordination Committees of Syria or the Supreme Council of the Syrian Revolution oppose the NCC calls to dialogue with the Syrian government. In September 2012, the Syrian National Council (SNC) reaffirmed that despite broadening its membership, it would not join with "currents close to [the] NCC". Despite recognizing the Free Syrian Army on 23 September 2012, the FSA has dismissed the NCC as an extension of the government, stating that "this opposition is just the other face of the same coin".

The NCC differs from the SNC on two main points of strategy:

1) The NCC refuses to accept foreign military intervention, although it does accept various forms of support for the opposition and supports Arab League involvement in the conflict.
2) It tries to emphasise nonviolent resistance to the Syrian government, despite endorsing the Free Syrian Army.

History
The Coordination Committee is largely based inside Syria, and was formed in 2011 at a congress in Damascus. It gathers all of the political parties of the National Democratic Rally, formerly Syria's main secular opposition coalition, and few other organizations. It has a generally secular membership, although not exclusively so. Most member organizations have a leftist profile, while some are also strongly Arab Nationalist or Kurdish Nationalist. Damascus-based lawyer Hassan Abdul Azim, the chairman, is also the spokesperson of the National Democratic Rally (Syria) and the chairman of the Democratic Arab Socialist Union, a banned Nasserist opposition party. The Coordination Committee's spokesperson abroad is Haytham Manna, a Paris-based author and human rights activist, who spent three decades as a human rights activist and spokesperson for the Arab Commission for Human Rights (ACHR), which he helped create.

At an 18 March 2012 demonstration during the Syrian civil war, a protest organised by the NCC in Damascus was smaller than countryside demonstrations. The demonstration had been announced publicly beforehand. Participants chanted, "The people want the fall of the regime". Several were beaten by security forces, and eleven members of the NCC were briefly detained.

The NCC has been hosted by Russia for talks with the Syrian government. During these talks in April 2012 SANA, the official news agency, claimed that the NCC and the government were in widespread agreement.

Post-China meeting 

In September 2012 the NCC met with Chinese Foreign Minister Yang Jiechi, and called for a four-point plan which included "political transition". Upon returning to Syria via Damascus International Airport, two of the NCC members who had been at the China meeting along with another NCC member who had come to collect them were detained by the Syrian government, with all contact being lost with them since 5:30 on 20 September. The NCC spokesman Khalaf Dahowd described this detainment as "kidnapping", with the NCC executive further elaborating that they believed the three members to have been "forcibly disappeared" by the Syrian Air Force Intelligence Directorate. The Syrian government on the other hand claimed that the NCC members were captured by "terrorist groups", despite having detained five other NCC members for the first time on Monday that week.

National Conference for Syria Salvation 
On 23 September 2012, the NCC held a rare meeting in Damascus, and for the first time recognized the Free Syrian Army, and for what The Washington Post described as the first time that the NCC formally called for the "overthrowing [of] the regime with all its symbols". The Preparatory Committee issued an eight-point statement which called for:

Toppling the government.
A rejection of sectarianism.
"Adopting non-violent resistance as the strategy to accomplish the goals of the revolution".
"Extract[ing]" the Syrian Army "from the clutches of the regime".
Holding the government accountable for its actions.
The protection of civilians and the upholding of international law.
Resolving the status of Kurds within a democratic framework.
The "undivided" cohesion of the Syrian nation.

2014 
After the pro-Assad Syrian Social Nationalist Party had withdrawn from the Popular Front for Change and Liberation, the NCC on 10 August 2014 signed a Memorandum of Understanding with the remaining Popular Front, calling for ″comprehensive grassroots change, which means the transition from the current authoritarian regime to a democratic pluralistic system within a democratic civil State based on the principle of equal citizenship to all Syrians regardless of their ethnic, religious and sectarian identities.″

2019
On 25 March 2019, the NCC condemned the United States' recognition of the disputed Golan Heights region as part of the State of Israel, calling on "the governments of the world and its peace-loving people" to oppose the US position.

Role within the Syrian opposition
In March 2012, the Coordination Committee was described by The New York Times as "one of Syria’s most moderate opposition groups" in the context of their demonstration where "officers in plain clothes beat them with sticks and began making arrests." Prior to September 2012, its members did not call for the dismantlement of the Syrian government or the removal of Bashar al-Assad as president, apart from their 18 March 2012 demonstration in Damascus when some of them chanted, "The people want the fall of the regime". The Coordination Committee, unlike the Syrian National Council, believed that the solution was to keep the current Syrian government, and hoped to resolve the current crisis through dialogue, in order to achieve "a safe and peaceful transition from a state of despotism to democracy".

List of constituent parties

See also
Arab Spring
Syrian Democratic Council
Movement for a Democratic Society

References

External links
Dr. Haytham Manna's personal webpage

2011 establishments in Syria
Democratic Union Party (Syria)
Organizations of the Arab Spring
Organizations of the Syrian civil war
Political opposition organizations
Political party alliances in Syria
Politics of Syria
Socialism in Syria
Syrian opposition